Rue Lhomond is a street in the 5th arrondissement of Paris, France. It is located in the quartier du Val-de-Grâce and has existed since the 15th century. It was once known as rue des Poteries after its Gallo-Roman pottery workshops (re-discovered in the 18th century), then from around 1600 as rue des Pots and finally rue des Postes. It was given its present name in 1867 after the priest, grammarian and scholar Charles François Lhomond (1727-1794).

History 
The street has housed several Catholic seminaries and convents, along with a British seminary established at number 22 by permission of Louis XIV of France in 1684 and active until 1790. 

Rue Lhomond features in the Georges Simenon novel ′Maigret Takes a Room′. In the novel Maigret takes a room in a boarding house to discover who shot his subordinate Janvier.

Buildings

References

Lhomond